"Friends" (stylized in all caps) is a song by American DJ and producer Marshmello and English singer Anne-Marie. It was written by the artists, and Nat Dunn.
 The song was released via Joytime Collective and Asylum Records on February 9, 2018, as the fifth single from Anne-Marie's debut studio album, Speak Your Mind (2018). A lyric video was released on the same day. The song peaked at number four on the UK Singles Chart and at number 11 on the US Billboard Hot 100. "Friends" was the ninth best-selling single of 2018 with sales of 9.6 million track-equivalent units according to the International Federation of the Phonographic Industry (IFPI).

Background and release
In 2016, Marshmello remixed Anne-Marie's song "Alarm". Fond of the remix, Anne-Marie wanted to collaborate with Marshmello, and eventually they met in a studio in London, where production of the song commenced. Initially Marshmello played some guitar, piano, synth and drum loops; listening to every single one they decided to proceed with guitar. Anne-Marie wrote the lyrics for the song corresponding to the loop. The major lyrics and drum sessions were completed in thirty minutes. Following next two hours, they completed the entire lyric session and the whole song was completed in three hours.

On February 4, 2018, both artists posted a teaser image for the single on social media, revealing the song's release date. They later posted a short audio clip on February 7, 2018. Speaking about the song with London Evening Standard, Anne-Marie said: "The idea came from a boy that I know that's my friend and he kind of he wanted to be more than my friend and I was like 'look brother how many times do I have to tell you we're just friends'. I thought it would be funny to write a song about it and there weren't that many songs about it and it works for Valentine's day for all the people who are single. I don't ever want him to know that it's about him because it's awkward. I do feel a bit bad but I'm trying to forget that it's about him and think about how funny it is about the situation."

Anne-Marie wrote on Genius: "I think this is the friend-zone anthem because I don't think there's been any other songs like this. I don't know if I've heard this, like this blatant in a song before. Like if you're trying to put someone in the friend zone, you can send them this song. And then everything will be sweet. That's why I feel like it's the friend-zone anthem."

Composition
"Friends" is an EDM-pop song performed in the key of A minor using  time with a tempo of 95 beats per minute. The vocals span from D4 to C6.

Critical reception
The song received generally positive reviews. Kat Bein of Billboard described the song as a blend of a wide variety of genres, writing: "The English singer delivers a bossy performance that would put any dog's tail between its legs, while Marshmello plays clever on acoustic guitar over a bumpin' electronic beat and even works in some G-Funk, West Coast synth work." Caitlin White of Uproxx called the song "a banger" that reaches "the level of unescapable that I most closely associate with the first time I heard The Chainsmokers wobbly pop ballad 'Paris'", stating that Anne-Marie "strikes the perfect balance between disdain and aggression". James Shotwell of Substream Magazine wrote: "'Friends' finds Marshmello abandoning the world of EDM for a far more traditional pop sound that perfectly pairs with vocalist Anne-Marie's entrancing croon." Brad McCrea of iHeartRadio deemed the song a combination of "strong dance beats" and "pop vocals from Anne-Marie". Mike Wass of Idolator noted that the song does not belong to the "sub-genre of pop songs about friends who become lovers", but instead is "a musical reminder to stop making a fool of yourself", calling the song "Marshmello's third big hit in a row", following "Silence" and "Wolves".

Music videos and promotion

A lyric video to "Friends" was first released on YouTube on February 9, 2018, at a total length of three minutes and twenty six seconds. , the lyric video has received over 1 billion views on YouTube. The music video, directed by Hannah Lux Davis, was released on February 16, 2018. In the video, Anne-Marie and a group of female friends host a house party. As the party comes to an end, Marshmello starts cleaning the house to avoid being asked to leave. However, Anne-Marie insists to kick him out, but he keeps finding ways to get back into the house, which annoys Anne-Marie and her friends. It echoes the song's lyrical content, by exploring the theme of being friend zoned, with Marshmello attempting to win Anne-Marie's love, but she just wants to be friends with him.

An alternate video was filmed at the Happy Place pop-up museum in Los Angeles and shows them in an upside down room, a yellow bathtub surrounded by rubber duckies, a giant neon XO with lip print wallpaper, a confetti-filled dome and a room filled with flowers. On March 7, 2018, Marshmello and Anne Marie joined to perform the song on The Tonight Show Starring Jimmy Fallon. The pair also performed a medley version of "Friends" alongside the single "Happier", with British band Bastille, at the 2018 MTV Europe Music Awards on November 4, 2018.

Track listing
Digital download
"Friends" – 3:22

Digital download – acoustic version
"Friends" (acoustic) – 3:29

Digital download – R3hab remix
"Friends" (R3hab remix) – 2:37

Digital download – Sikdope remix
"Friends" (Sikdope remix) – 2:43

Digital download – Borgeous remix
"Friends" (Borgeous remix) – 3:22

Digital download – A Boogie wit da Hoodie remix
"Friends" (A Boogie wit da Hoodie remix) – 3:22

Digital download – Justin Caruso remix
"Friends" (Justin Caruso remix) – 3:14

Personnel
Credits adapted from Tidal.
 Marshmello – production, programming
 Anne-Marie – vocals
 Stuart Hawkes – master engineering
 Cameron Gower-Poole – engineering
 Michael Freeman – mix engineering assistance
 Spike Stent – mixing

Charts

Weekly charts

Monthly charts

Year-end charts

Certifications

Release history

See also
 Friendzone
 List of number-one songs of 2018 (Malaysia)
 List of number-one songs of 2018 (Singapore)

References

External links
 

2018 singles
2018 songs
Anne-Marie (singer) songs
Asylum Records singles
Dutch Top 40 number-one singles
Marshmello songs
Animated music videos
Music videos directed by Hannah Lux Davis
Number-one singles in Austria
Number-one singles in the Commonwealth of Independent States
Number-one singles in Germany
Number-one singles in Israel
Number-one singles in Malaysia
Number-one singles in Singapore
Number-one singles in Russia
Songs about friendship
Songs written by Marshmello
Songs written by Richard Boardman
Songs written by Pablo Bowman
Songs written by Anne-Marie (singer)
Songs written by Sarah Blanchard
Songs written by Nat Dunn